This is a list of notable events in country music that took place in 1966.

Events
 March 15 — Roger Miller wins six Grammy Awards, five of them related to his hit "King of the Road". The Statler Brothers take two awards for "Flowers on the Wall".
 April — One of the last broadcasts of The Jimmy Dean Show features the first-ever Academy of Country Music awards. Big winners include Male Vocalist of the Year Buck Owens, Female Vocalist Bonnie Owens, and New Male Vocalist Merle Haggard; Haggard also shared the Vocal Duet/Group award with Bonnie Owens. Taped for later broadcast that year, the ACM Awards would in time become among the most anticipated events of the year by country fans.
 September – Buck Owens' first nationally syndicated program, Buck Owens Ranch Show, debuts in syndication, running primarily in the rural South. The show eventually lasts six years, the final three years overlapping with Owens' stint as co-host of Hee Haw.
 October 15 — Billboard increases the length of its Hot Country Singles chart to 75 positions, up from 50.
 October 22 — At age 48, Eddy Arnold becomes the youngest (to that time) living inductee into the Country Music Hall of Fame.

No dates
 The single "The Snakes Crawl at Night", by a then-unknown singer named "Country" Charley Pride, is released in the spring but does not chart. After the follow-up single "Before I Met You" also does not chart, a third single, "Just Between You and Me" is released in December and early in 1967 becomes the singer's first major hit, and the first top 10 country hit by an African-American singer in more than 20 years. Pride, who will later drop the "Country" moniker from his name (although disc jockeys will continue using it to this day), goes on to become the most successful black singer in country music history.

Top hits of the year

Number-one hits

United States
(as certified by Billboard)

Notes
1^ No. 1 song of the year, as determined by Billboard.
2^ Song dropped from No. 1 and later returned to top spot.
A^ First Billboard No. 1 hit for that artist.

Canada
(as certified by RPM)

Notes
2^ Song dropped from No. 1 and later returned to top spot.
A^ First RPM No. 1 hit for that artist.
B^ Last RPM No. 1 hit for that artist.
C^ Only RPM No. 1 hit for that artist.

Other major hits

Singles released by American artists

Singles released by Canadian artists

Top new album releases

Births
 January 4 — Deana Carter, singer-songwriter who enjoyed a string of hits in the mid-to-late 1990s.
 May 13 — Darius Rucker, African-American singer and Hootie & the Blowfish lead vocalist who became a rising country star in the late 2000s (decade).
 July 29 — Martina McBride, crossover-styled female vocalist who rose to fame in the 1990s.
 August 19 — Lee Ann Womack, new traditionalist-styled singer of the 1990s and 2000s (decade) most famous for her crossover hit "I Hope You Dance."
 October 6 - Tim Rushlow, lead singer of Little Texas from 1988 to 1997.
 December 17 — Tracy Byrd, male honky tonk-styled vocalist since the 1990s.

Deaths
July 1 — Slim Willet, 46, disc jockey and singer-songwriter (heart attack).

Country Music Hall of Fame Inductees
Eddy Arnold (1918–2008)
James R. Denny (1911–1963)
George D. Hay (1895–1968)
Uncle Dave Macon (1870–1952)

Major awards

Grammy Awards
Best Country and Western Vocal Performance, Female — "Don't Touch Me", Jeannie Seely
Best Country and Western Vocal Performance, Male — "Almost Persuaded", David Houston
Best Country and Western Recording — "Almost Persuaded", David Houston
Best Country and Western Song — "Almost Persuaded", Billy Sherrill and Glenn Sutton (Performer: David Houston)

Academy of Country Music
Top Male Vocalist — Merle Haggard
Top Female Vocalist — Bonnie Guitar
Top New Male Vocalist — Billy Mize
Top New Female Vocalist — Cathie Taylor

See also
Country Music Association
Inductees of the Country Music Hall of Fame

Further reading
Kingsbury, Paul, "The Grand Ole Opry: History of Country Music. 70 Years of the Songs, the Stars and the Stories," Villard Books, Random House; Opryland USA, 1995
Kingsbury, Paul, "Vinyl Hayride: Country Music Album Covers 1947–1989," Country Music Foundation, 2003
Millard, Bob, "Country Music: 70 Years of America's Favorite Music," HarperCollins, New York, 1993
Whitburn, Joel, "Top Country Songs 1944–2005 – 6th Edition." 2005.

External links
Country Music Hall of Fame

Country
Country music by year